John Bole (fl. 1407–1420) was an English Member of Parliament.

He was a Member (MP) of the Parliament of England for Shaftesbury in 1407, 1410, May 1413 and 1420.

References

14th-century births
15th-century deaths
English MPs 1407
English MPs 1410
English MPs May 1413
English MPs 1420